John Wesley Edwards,  (May 25, 1865 – April 18, 1929) was a Canadian politician.

Born in Storrington Township, Canada West, he was a physician and teacher, before being elected to the House of Commons of Canada in the riding of Frontenac in the 1908 federal election. A Conservative, he was re-elected in 1911 and 1917 but was defeated in 1921. He was re-elected again in 1925 and 1926. He died in office in 1929. In 1921, he was the Minister presiding over the Department of Health and Minister of Immigration and Colonization.

References

1865 births
1929 deaths
Conservative Party of Canada (1867–1942) MPs
Members of the House of Commons of Canada from Ontario
Members of the King's Privy Council for Canada
Unionist Party (Canada) MPs